Tejaswini Pandit (Pronunciation: [t̪ed͡ʒəsʋiniː pəɳɖit̪]; born 23 May 1986) is a Marathi film and television actress. She made her debut with Kedar Shinde's Aga Bai Arrecha! film. She made her television debut with Star Pravah's Tuza Ni Maza Ghar Shrimantacha. She known for her lead roles in Mee Sindhutai Sapkal, Tu Hi Re and Ye Re Ye Re Paisa.

Career
Pandit played a negative role in Aga Bai Arrecha, directed by Kedar Shinde. After that, she did a theatre play; Rakheli. She next played a role of a woman who gets trapped with a terrorist group in Vavtal. She was also seen in the film Gaiir. She was next seen playing the titular role in the film  Mee Sindhutai Sapkal, based on a real story. Her 2013 film Mukti was based on farmer suicide cases. She next played alongside Swapnil Joshi and Sai Tamhankar in director Sanjay Jadhav's film, Tu Hi Re. She plays the role of one of the lead characters of Samantar - an MX Player web series that also stars Swapnil Joshi.

Personal life
Tejaswini married her childhood sweetheart Bhushan Bopche on 16 December 2012. Bhushan is the son of industrialist Rameshwar Roopchand Bopche. The marriage ceremony took place in Gondia on 16 December 2012. Later they separated.

Filmography

Films

Television

Awards and nominations

References

External links 
Tejaswini Pandi
 t on IMDb

1986 births
Living people
Actresses in Marathi cinema
Actresses from Pune
21st-century Indian actresses
Indian television actresses
Indian film actresses